Dheerga Sumangali is a 1974 Indian Tamil-language drama film co-written and directed by A. C. Tirulokchandar. The film was produced by N. S. Rajendran under Visalakshi Combines and stars K. R. Vijaya and Muthuraman, while Major Sundarrajan, V. K. Ramasamy and Sivakumar play supporting roles. The film's soundtrack and background score were composed by M. S. Viswanathan, while the lyrics for the songs were written by Kannadasan and Vaali.

M. Viswanatha Rai and B. Kandasamy handled cinematography and editing respectively. The film's story was written by G. Balasubramaniam and the dialogues were written by Karaikudi Narayanan. The film was released on 12 April 1974. It was remade in Telugu as Dheerga Sumangali (1974), Kannada as Bhagyavantharu (1977), in Malayalam as Aayiram Janmangal (1976) and in Hindi as Sadaa Suhagan (1986).

Plot

Cast 
K. R. Vijaya as Lakshmi
Muthuraman as Sundaram
Major Sundarrajan
V. K. Ramasamy
Sivakumar
Suruli Rajan
Mahendran
Pushpalatha
Jayachitra
Jayasudha
C. K. Saraswathi
S. N. Lakshmi

Production 
The dialogues of Dheerga Sumangali were written by Karaikudi Narayanan. S. N. Lakshmi who acted in the film recalled that during the climax scene, Tirulokchandar suggested her to cry without glycerine and she had enacted as per his instructions. Sivakumar and Vijaya who earlier acted as lead pair enacted the roles of son and mother in this film.

Soundtrack 
The soundtrack was composed by M. S. Viswanathan, while the lyrics were written by Kannadasan and Vaali. The song "Malligai En Mannan" was well received and gave breakthrough for its playback singer Vani Jairam. Vani recalled that it was a challenging song and "he (Viswanathan) trusted me with it".  When Vani was in Madras (now Chennai) for two music concerts at a Bhajan Sammelan, Viswanathan, who was the chief guest, was impressed by her performance and gave her the opportunity to sing the song.

Release and reception 
Dheerga Sumangali was released on 12 April 1974. Kanthan of Kalki praised Tirulokchander's direction and writing. Vijaya won the Filmfare Special Commendation Award for Performance.

Remakes 
The film was remade in Kannada as Bhagyavantharu (1977), in Malayalam as Aayiram Janmangal (1976) and in Hindi as Sadaa Suhagan (1986).

References

External links 
 

1970s Tamil-language films
1974 drama films
1974 films
Films directed by A. C. Tirulokchandar
Films scored by M. S. Viswanathan
Indian black-and-white films
Indian drama films
Tamil films remade in other languages